
Year 341 BC was a year of the pre-Julian Roman calendar. At the time it was known as the Year of the Consulship of Venno and Privernas (or, less frequently, year 413 Ab urbe condita). The denomination 341 BC for this year has been used since the early medieval period, when the Anno Domini calendar era became the prevalent method in Europe for naming years.

Events 
 By place 
 Macedonia 
 Philip II of Macedon completes his annexation of Thrace. This is regarded by Athens as a further threat to the city's safety.

 Greece 
 Demosthenes delivers his Third Philippic. In it, he demands resolute action against Philip II.  Demosthenes now dominates Athenian politics and is able to considerably weaken the pro-Macedonian faction led by Aeschines. As a result, Demosthenes becomes controller of the Athenian navy.
 A grand alliance is organised by Demosthenes against Philip II, which includes Byzantium and former enemies of Athens, such as Thebes. These developments worry Philip and increase his anger towards Demosthenes. The Athenian Assembly, however, lays aside Philip's grievances against Demosthenes' conduct and denounces the Peace of Philocrates which has been signed by both sides in 346 BC, an action equivalent to an official declaration of war by Athens against Macedonia.

 Roman Republic 
 The First Samnite War ends with Rome triumphant and the Samnites willing to make peace. The war is ended with a hasty peace agreement, owing to a revolt by Rome's Latin allies, who resent their dependence on the dominant city. Despite its brevity, the First Samnite War results in the major acquisition by Rome of the rich land of Campania with its capital of Capua.

References